Evan Jones (born 20 October 1888) was a Welsh international footballer. He was part of the Wales national football team between 1910 and 1914, playing 7 matches. He played his first match on 5 March 1910 against Scotland and his last match on 19 January 1914 against Ireland.

See also
 List of Wales international footballers (alphabetical)

References

1888 births
Welsh footballers
Wales international footballers
Place of birth missing
Date of death missing
Association footballers not categorized by position